Alexander Igorevich Asov (born 29 June 1964), alias Bus Kresen (Бус Кресень), is an author of books in Russian pseudohistory (called "фолк-хистори" ("folk-history") in Russian publications), as well as novels and poems. He is best known as translator and commenter of allegedly ancient Slavic texts, including Book of Veles, widely recognized as forgeries.

In 2012, a forum of several rodnoveriye (Russian neopaganism) movements published a declaration, which described studies of A. Asov (along with some others) as detrimental to Russian neopaganism.

References

Living people
Pseudohistorians
Russian writers
Modern pagan writers
Russian modern pagans
1964 births